Likane Julie Toualy (born 1976) is an Ivorian team handball player. She plays on the Ivorian national team, and participated at the 2011 World Women's Handball Championship in Brazil.

References

1976 births
Living people
Ivorian female handball players
Date of birth missing (living people)